massstar (Hangul: 맛스타) is a South Korean webtoon artist. She is best known for her webcomic unTouchable.

Career 
massstar developed a love of drawing when she was young, and wanted to be a comics artist since she was in primary school. However, she hesitated to take up comics due to a belief in Korea that comic artists are unable to feed themselves. When she was in university, she decided that she should try to follow her passion because she "only lived once." massstar participated in a comic competition held by Naver, which gave her the chance to debut.

massstar created the webtoon unTouchable, a story about vampires who absorb energy as a source of life through physical contact rather than drinking blood. From February 2014 onwards, unTouchable was serialized on WEBTOON. In July of the same year, the Chinese and English translated versions of unTouchable were serialized on the service as well.

In February 2015, massstar attended the Taipei International Comics and Animation Festival together with fellow webtoon artist Oh Seong-dae. Both of them hosted autograph sessions in the WEBTOON booth.

unTouchable was later adapted into a Chinese television series in 2017. The series stars Zhang Yuxi and Xing Zhaolin, and gained a significant following.

References

External links 
 unTouchable on Naver Webtoon
 unTouchable on WEBTOON

Living people
South Korean female comics artists
South Korean manhwa artists
South Korean webtoon creators
South Korean women artists
Year of birth missing (living people)